Arnaldo André (born November 12, 1943) is a Paraguayan actor for soap-operas. He spent most of his career in Argentina, where he has been active since 1964. He earned a Martín Fierro award in 2010, and his most recent work was in the Los únicos TV series.

Biography
Arnaldo André was born in San Bernardino, Paraguay in 1943. His father died when he was aged 11, and he took care of his family since then. He grew up influenced by American and Italian Movies, and initially intended to make a name in Argentina and, from there, move to other countries. However, as his career developed, he did not follow this initial plan. He did not become a movie actor either, working mainly in TV telenovelas and productions by Alberto Migré a well-known Argentine writer and TV producer in protagonic couples with Soledad Silveyra. His work in TV allowed some occasional works in theater and cinema, and also works at telenovelas in other South American countries.

Arnaldo Andre made many protagonic couples with Luisa Kuliok. His character from Amo y Señor was noted for his slapping of his wife. The first slap was used in a promotion of the telenovela at its early stages, and the positive popular reception turned this into a cliché. He kept on slapping his fellow actresses in later telenovelas, and always slapped them for real; which caused an incident with Giselle Blondet, who was not aware of it. Arnaldo André retired his slapping act after Carlos Monzón was sentenced for the death of his wife, in a widely publicized trial. Nowadays, Arnaldo André thinks that he would not do a similar character, because of the public concern about corporal punishment in the home. He also thinks that feminism is greater now than in the 1980s, and a female character submissive to corporal punishment would not be considered realistic by the public anymore.

Arnaldo André worked as the main villain of the Valientes telenovela, which is among the most successful Argentine telenovelas. This was the first time he played character of a villain instead of a gentleman, as he thought he had exhausted the role during his career. Even so, as a villain he used little physical violence, working instead like a crime boss. He earned the 2009 Martín Fierro award as best male lead actor of telenovela with this work. He worked during 2011 in the superhero live-action television series Los únicos.

Works

TV

Cinema

References

External links
 
 CineNacionalcom 

Paraguayan male film actors
Paraguayan film directors
Expatriate male actors in Argentina
1943 births
Living people
People from Cordillera Department
Paraguayan emigrants to Argentina
Paraguayan male telenovela actors
20th-century Paraguayan male actors
21st-century Paraguayan male actors